Ilansky District is an administrative and municipal district (raion), one of the forty-three in Krasnoyarsk Krai, Russia. It is located in the southeast of the krai and borders with Abansky District in the north, Nizhneingashsky District in the east, Irbeysky District in the south, Irkutsk Oblast in the southeast, and with Kansky District in the west. Its administrative center is the town of Ilansky. Population:  The population of the administrative center accounts for 62.2% of the district's total population.

History
The district was founded on November 7, 1939.

Government
As of 2013, the Head of the District and the Chairman of the District Council is Olga A. Alkhimenko.

Demographics

Economy

Transportation
The Trans-Siberian Railway runs through the district from west to east. A part of M53 Highway passes through the district as well.

References

Notes

Sources

Districts of Krasnoyarsk Krai
States and territories established in 1939